Dameon Johnson (born October 29, 1976, in Baltimore, Maryland) is an American former sprinter.

References

1976 births
Living people
American male sprinters
World Athletics Indoor Championships winners
Track and field athletes from Baltimore